João Cândido Lourenço (25 February 1917 – September 1998) was a Portuguese racing cyclist. Professional from 1939 to 1950, he notably won a stage of the Vuelta a España, 21 stages of the Volta a Portugal and the 1942 Portuguese national road race championships.

Major results

1939
 1st Stage 1 Tour du Maroc
1940
 1st Stages 1, 3, 5, 7, 12, & 14 Volta a Portugal
1941
 1st Stages 2a, 2b, 3, 5, 8b, 9a, 11a, 14, 15a & 15b Volta a Portugal
 2nd Sprint, National Track Championships
1942
 1st  National Road Race Championships
 1st  Sprint, National Track Championships
 1st  Overall Vuelta a Mallorca
 1st Stage 3 Volta a Catalunya
1943
 1st  Sprint, National Track Championships
1944
 1st  Sprint, National Track Championships
1946
 1st Stage 7 Vuelta a España
 1st Stages 8 & 15 Volta a Portugal
1947
 1st Stages 2, 12 & 15 Volta a Portugal

References

External links
 

1917 births
1998 deaths
Portuguese male cyclists
Portuguese Vuelta a España stage winners
People from Silves, Portugal
Sportspeople from Faro District